Yana Kusma (Quechua yana black, kusma nightdress, shirt of a woman, "black nightdress" or "black shirt", Hispanicized spelling Yanacusma) is a mountain in the Andes of Peru, about  high. It is situated in the Ayacucho Region, Huanca Sancos Province, Sancos District.

References

Mountains of Peru
Mountains of Ayacucho Region